This is a list of Sepahan F.C.'s results at the Persian Gulf Cup 2008-09, Hazfi Cup 2008-09 and 2009 ACL. The club is competing in the Iran Pro League, Hazfi Cup and Asian Champions League.

Persian Gulf Cup

Statistics 
Last updated sep 14 2008

Matches 
Last updated Apr 26 2009

Results by round

Results summary

League standings

Top scorers

Goal scorers 

14
  Emad Mohammed

6
  Ehsan Hajsafi

4
  Hadi Asghari
  Moharram Navidkia
  Mehdi Jafarpour
  Ahmad Jamshidian

3
  Bahman Tahmasebi

1
  Jalal Akbari
  Hamed Kiani
  Farshad Bahadorani
  Hadi Aghily
  Armando Sá

Cards

Matches played 

25
  Jalal Akbari

Hazfi Cup 2008-09

Bracket

Scorers in Hazfi Cup 2008/09 

Last updated Nov 24 2008

Goalscorers 

3
  Ahmad Jamshidian

2
  Jalal Ali Mohamammadi
  Ehsan Hajsafi

Cards

Scorers in 2008-09 season 

Last updated Apr 16 2009

Goalscorers 

14
  Emad Mohammed

Asian Champions League 2009

Group D

Sepahan schedule ACL 2009

Scorers in ACLeague 2009

Goalscorers 

2
  Emad Mohammed

1
  Hadi Aghily
  Mehdi Jafarpour
  Rasoul Khatibi
  Hossein Papi
  Hadi Asghari
  Hamid Azizzadeh
  Armando Sá

Cards

Squad changes during 2008/09 season

In

Out

References 

 
 

2008-09
Iranian football clubs 2008–09 season